Sky Witness is a British pay television channel owned and operated by Sky, a division of Comcast. The channel primarily broadcasts drama shows from the United States, aimed at the 18–45 age group. An Italian version of Sky Witness, named Sky Investigation, launched on 1 July 2021.

History 
Sky Witness' history can be traced back to 1993 when UK Living began broadcasting on 1 September 1993. The channel was purchased by BSkyB in 2010 and announced on 25 October 2010, that Living would be rebranded as Sky Living in early 2011 to improve their entertainment line-up.

On 8 June 2018, Sky announced that Sky Living would be closed and replaced on 6 August by a new channel Sky Witness, bringing an end to the Living brand after 25 years.

Following the acquisition of Sky by Comcast, which already operated Universal TV, much of the programming previously screened on Universal TV, particularly first-run acquired series, transferred to Sky Witness, allowing Universal to be closed and replaced by Sky Comedy.

Programming

US programming
9-1-1
9-1-1 Lone Star
Blindspot
Departure (moved from Universal TV)
Bull (moved from Fox UK)
Blue Bloods (moved from Sky Atlantic)
Chicago Fire (moved from 5USA)
Chicago Med (moved from Universal TV)
Chicago P.D. (moved from 5USA)
Coroner (moved from Universal TV)
FBI
FBI: Most Wanted
FBI: International
Law & Order
Law & Order: Organized Crime
Law and Order: Special Victims Unit (moved from Universal TV)
New Amsterdam (moved from Amazon Prime Video)
The Equalizer
The Good Doctor
The Rookie
The Rookie: Feds
Transplant

Upcoming programming

East New York

Sky Witness in Ireland
Sky Witness is also available in Ireland via Sky Ireland and Virgin Media Ireland. The Irish opt-out feed features localised advertising and sponsorship.

The same Sky Witness schedule, shown in both the UK and Ireland, also includes a selection of documentary programming from both the Irish Broadcasters, RTE and TV3/Virgin Media Television Ireland (the Irish broadcaster now owned by the cable TV company of the same name in Ireland, not to be confused with the earlier Flextech version of Virgin Media Television). Also there is some independently produced series, some commissioned directly by Sky, focusing on Ireland's various emergency services, medical,  and certain Government of Ireland agencies, such as the Revenue Commissioners. The selection is similar to the genres focusing on other countries equivalent agencies, also shown on Sky Witness.

Sky Investigation

An Italian version of Sky Witness called Sky Investigation launched on 1 July 2021 with programming such as The Equalizer, Unforgettable, The Blacklist, Coroner, Law & Order, Law & Order: SVU, Bull, Private Eyes, Elementary and NCIS.

References

External links
Sky Witness at sky.com
Sky Investigation HD su Sky: 114 | Sky Sky Investigation

Sky television channels
2018 establishments in the United Kingdom
English-language television stations in the United Kingdom
Television channels in the United Kingdom
Television channels and stations established in 2018